UFC Fight Night: Saint Preux vs. Okami (also known as UFC Fight Night 117) was a mixed martial arts event produced by the Ultimate Fighting Championship held on September 23, 2017 at Saitama Super Arena in Saitama, Japan.

Background
The event was the fifth that the organization has hosted in Saitama, and first since UFC Fight Night: Barnett vs. Nelson in September 2015.

A light heavyweight rematch between former UFC Light Heavyweight Champion Maurício Rua and former interim title challenger Ovince Saint Preux was expected to headline this event. The pairing met previously at UFC Fight Night: Shogun vs. Saint Preux in November 2014 where Saint Preux defeated Rua via knockout in the fight's opening minute. On September 16, Rua withdrew from the fight due to a knee injury and was replaced by returning veteran, former UFC Middleweight Championship challenger Yushin Okami.

Naoki Inoue was expected to face Jenel Lausa at the event, but pulled out on September 9 due to a dislocated shoulder. As a result, Lausa was removed from the card and is expected to be rescheduled against a new opponent at a future event.

At the weigh-ins, Mizuto Hirota missed the featherweight limit of 146 pounds, coming in at 150 pounds. As a result his bout with Charles Rosa was changed to a catchweight and the fight was initially expected to proceed as scheduled. Subsequently, Hirota was fined 30% of his purse. Later that day, Hirota was pulled due to health and safety concerns, as he was deemed unfit to compete by the UFC medical team.

Results

Bonus awards
The following fighters were awarded $50,000 bonuses:
Fight of the Night: Jéssica Andrade vs Cláudia Gadelha 
Performance of the Night: Ovince Saint Preux and Gökhan Saki

See also
List of UFC events
2017 in UFC

References

UFC Fight Night
2017 in mixed martial arts
Mixed martial arts in Japan
Sport in Saitama (city)
September 2017 sports events in Japan